Mark Radoja (born 1985) is a Canadian professional poker player. He has won two World Series of Poker bracelets.
As of 2013, his total live tournament winnings exceed $1,500,000. $1,469,638 of his winnings have come at the WSOP.

References

External links
Radoja's post game interview

1985 births
Canadian poker players
Living people
People from Guelph
World Series of Poker bracelet winners